Charaxes mccleeryi is a butterfly in the family Nymphalidae. It is found in Tanzania. The habitat consists of lowland to montane forests at altitudes from 600 to 2,150 meters.

The larvae feed on Albizia species.

Taxonomy
Charaxes mccleeryi is a member of the large species group Charaxes etheocles

Similar to Charaxes congdoni but larger and with longer tails. Differs from Charaxes usambarae in the less dentate wing margins

Subspecies
Charaxes mccleeryi mccleeryi (north-eastern Tanzania)
Charaxes mccleeryi iringae Kielland, 1990  (Tanzania: central to the Iringa District)

References

Victor Gurney Logan Van Someren, 1972 Revisional notes on African Charaxes (Lepidoptera: Nymphalidae). Part VIII. Bulletin of the British Museum (Natural History) (Entomology)215-264.

External links
Charaxes maccleeryi images at Consortium for the Barcode of Life

Butterflies described in 1972
mccleeryi
Endemic fauna of Tanzania
Butterflies of Africa